Gustavo Martínez Doreste (born 21 March 1975) is a Spanish sailor who competed in the 2000 and 2004 Summer Olympics.

Notes

References

External links
 
 
 
 

1975 births
470 class sailors
Living people
Olympic sailors of Spain
Real Club Náutico de Gran Canaria sailors
Sailors at the 2004 Summer Olympics – 470
Sailors at the 2000 Summer Olympics – 470
Spanish male sailors (sport)
420 class world champions
World champions in sailing for Spain